KILJ-FM (105.5 FM) is a commercial radio station that serves the Mount Pleasant, Iowa area.  The station broadcasts an easy listening format.  KILJ-FM is licensed to KILJ Inc which is owned by Paul and Joyce Dennison. They also own sister station KILJ 1130 AM.

In addition to the music, the station provides national, state and local news, along with high school and college sports, weather, and grain and livestock markets.

According to the company website, the station was started by Frosty Mitchell and former Iowa governor Robert D. Ray in 1970. Paul and Joyce Dennison purchased the station in 1977.

The sports department is headed by the award-winning Nathan Bloechl. Bloechl provides play-by-play for several southeast Iowa prep programs, is the voice of Iowa Wesleyan athletics and is the host of Beyond the Game.

Theresa Rose leads the news department.

The two of them co-host a daily morning talk show.

The transmitter and broadcast tower are located southwest of Mount Pleasant on Oakland Mills Road.

References

External links
KILJ-FM website

ILJ